Rosalind Wiseman is an American author and public speaker. She is a multiple New York Times bestselling author, including Queen Bees and Wannabes: Helping Your Daughter Survive Cliques, Gossip, Boyfriends, and Other Realities of Adolescence— that was the basis for Mean Girls.

In 2015, Wiseman co-founded Cultures of Dignity. Wiseman is the creator of the Owning Up Curriculum.

She lives in Colorado with her husband and two sons.

Early life
Wiseman grew up in Washington, D.C. with her two younger siblings and parents Kathy, a management consultant, and Steve Wiseman, a real estate developer. After attending Maret School in Washington, DC she attended Occidental College in Los Angeles, where she began studying martial arts with fellow student James Edwards, whom she married in 1996. By the time she graduated with a bachelor's degree in Political Science in 1991, Wiseman had earned a second degree blackbelt in Tang Soo Do karate.

Wiseman is Jewish, with Jewish ancestors from Poland and Germany.

Career
Wiseman and Edwards moved back to Washington, D.C. after graduating, where she began to teach martial arts to young women. After hearing the young girls' questions about social issues they faced, and watching them become empowered by martial arts, Wiseman was inspired to begin working in youth empowerment and leadership-building.

After spending over a decade speaking with girls about the complex social issues they face, including boys, cliques, gossip, social hierarchy, and self-image, Wiseman wrote and published Queen Bees & Wannabes: Helping Your Daughter Survive Cliques, Gossip, Boyfriends & Other Realities of Girl World. The book gives suggestions on how parents can better understand and help their daughters navigate the social atmosphere of what Wiseman refers to as "Girl World." It includes candid quotes from the girls Wiseman interviewed. Since its release in 2004, it has become a New York Times Best Seller.

Works
Queen Bees & Wannabes: Helping Your Daughter Survive Cliques, Gossip, Boyfriends & Other Realities of Adolescence (2002),  
Queen Bee Moms & Kingpin Dads: Dealing with the Parents, Teachers, Coaches, and Counselors Who Can Make — or Break — Your Child's Future (2006), 
Owning Up Curriculum: Empowering Adolescents to Confront Social Cruelty, Bullying, and Injustice (2009),  
Queen Bees & Wannabes: Helping Your Daughter Survive Cliques, Gossip, Boyfriends, and the New Realities of Girl World, (2009),  
Boys, Girls & Other Hazardous Materials (2010), Penguin Books  
Masterminds and Wingmen: Helping Our Boys Cope with Schoolyard Power, Locker-Room Tests, Girlfriends, and the New Rules of Boy World (2013)
The Guide: Managing Douchebags, Recruiting Wingmen, and Attracting Who You Want (2013), ASIN B00EZB57QC
Owning Up Curriculum (2020)
Distance Learning Playbook for Parents: How to Support Your Child’s Academic, Emotional and Social Learning in Any Setting (2020), 
Courageous Discomfort: How to have Brave, Life Changing Conversations about Race and Racism (August 2022) by Chronicle Books. Co-authored with Shanterra McBride,

References

External links

Queen Bees and Wannabes: Helping Your Daughter Survive Cliques, Gossip, Boyfriends, and the New Realities of Girl World
Owning Up Curriculum
"Queen Bee Moms & Kingpin Dads" online interview, 29 March 2006, washingtonpost.com

American self-help writers
Writers from Washington, D.C.
Living people
Occidental College alumni
Place of birth missing (living people)
21st-century American women writers
21st-century American non-fiction writers
American women non-fiction writers
1969 births